Daniel Ionuț Isăilă (born 29 June 1972 in Brașov) is a Romanian retired footballer and current manager of Baniyas.

A former defender, Isăilă played 149 matches in Liga I, scoring seven goals. He played eight times in the UEFA Cup, four games each with Rapid București and FC Brașov.

Coaching career
He began his coaching career in 2006 at second league club FC Săcele. He then joined the technical staff of Răzvan Lucescu, becoming his assistant at FC Brașov.

From July 2010 he was in numerous occasions the head coach of FC Brașov, overseen by technical director Daniel Oprea, Isăilă not having the PRO License coach certificate yet.

In November 2011, Isăilă signed a contract for four seasons with Sportul Studențesc. The club relegated under his command. In August 2012, he moved to second division club FCM Târgu Mureș, where he received a contract for a season with the main objective being promotion in Liga I. He resigned in the middle of the season, because the team was far from reaching the target, being only 5th after 16 games.

In April 2013, he was appointed head coach of Liga I side Astra Giurgiu. With Astra Giurgiu he had fantastic performances and in two years he won almost everything possible. In his first season in charge, he won the Cupa României at the National Arena Stadium against Steaua Bucharest in front of 53,000 Steaua supporters. On 11 July he won the second historical cup for Astra, the Supercup, again against Steaua Bucharest. After the best performance of Astra Giurgiu in the Championship, (2nd place) he qualified his team in the Europa League group stages for the first time, winning against Olympique Lyon in a fantastic double match which will remain in the history of the club. In October 2014, he stepped down as manager of Astra. In October the same year, he became one of the assistant coaches for the Romania national team working under Anghel Iordănescu and later Christoph Daum.

In December 2016, Isăilă was named as the head coach of Romania under-21 national team. After nearly two years in control he gave up the national team, thus leaving it with chances of qualifying to the 2019 UEFA European Under-21 Championship.

In June 2018, he signed with newly promoted Saudi Professional League side Al-Hazem. He was sacked on 31 January 2020 following a 0–0 draw with Al-Taawoun.

Coaching stats

Honours

Manager
Astra Giurgiu
Cupa României: 2013–14
Supercupa României: 2014

Baniyas
 UAE Pro League runner-up: 2020–21

References

External links

1972 births
Living people
Sportspeople from Brașov
Romanian footballers
Romanian football managers
Association football defenders
FC Brașov (1936) players
FC Rapid București players
Liga I players
FC Brașov (1936) managers
FC Astra Giurgiu managers
FC Sportul Studențesc București managers
ASA 2013 Târgu Mureș managers
Al-Hazm FC managers
Baniyas SC managers
Expatriate football managers in Saudi Arabia
Expatriate football managers in the United Arab Emirates
Saudi Professional League managers
UAE Pro League managers